Dhabeji (Sindhi: ڌاٻيجي, also known as Dhabeji Station), is a town and union council of Mirpur Sakro tehsil, Thatta District, Pakistan. It was previously in Thatta District, Sindh.

It is near the suburbs of Karachi. As well being declared an industrial zone by the Government of Sindh there is also a water treatment plant providing water for Karachi City from the Indus River.The Smart School Al Kausar Gharo Dhabeji Campus, a project of The City School, with the remarkable success is now imparting distinctive and meaningful education in Dhabeji as well. Along with The Smart School Al Kausar Gharo Dhabeji Campus, many other institutes like The Educators School and The Spirit School are trying very hard to educate Dhabeji and its surroundings now.

Coordinations

Dhabeji is located at 24'47" N 67'31" E.

History

When, in late 711 AD, Imad-ud-din Muhammad bin Qasim, following two failed expeditions, led an army of 12000 to the kingdom of Sind, which was then ruled by a Brahman, Dahir, son of Chach, he crossed the frontier form Gedrosia, the modern Makran, then part of Caliphate, into the dominion of Dahir near Dhabeji, then called Armail, to besiege Debul, a town twenty-four mile south-west of the modern city of Thatta. Historically, the town was also called Darbeji.[2]

References

2.Cambridge History of India, Volume ||, Turks and Afghans, Ch. # 1, The Arab Conquest of Sindh. 

Populated places in Sujawal District
Union councils of Sindh